Hanna-Maari Latvala (born 30 October 1987 in Kokkola, Finland) is a Finnish sprinter.

Competition record

References

External links 
 Hanna-Maari Latvala official homepage

1987 births
Living people
Finnish female sprinters
Universiade medalists in athletics (track and field)
People from Kokkola
Universiade silver medalists for Finland
Finnish Athletics Championships winners
World Athletics Championships athletes for Finland
Medalists at the 2013 Summer Universiade
Sportspeople from Central Ostrobothnia